John Burpee Mills,  (July 24, 1850 – December 28, 1913) was a Canadian lawyer and politician.

Born in Granville Ferry, Nova Scotia, the son of John Mills and Jane McCormick, Mills received a Bachelor of Arts degree in 1871 and a Master of Arts degree in 1877 from Acadia College. He also attended Harvard Law School and was called to the Bar of Nova Scotia in 1875. He was created a Queen's Counsel in 1890. In 1905, he was called to the British Columbia Bar. Miller began the practice of law in Annapolis Royal, Nova Scotia and later practised in Vancouver. He was editor of the Annapolis Spectator.

He was a member from 1882 until 1887 of the municipal council of Annapolis, Nova Scotia. He was first elected to the House of Commons of Canada for the electoral district of Annapolis in the 1887 election. A Conservative, he was re-elected in 1891 and 1896. He was defeated in the 1900 election.

Mills was married twice: first to Bessie B. Corbitt in 1878 and then to Agnes K. Rose in 1896. He died in Providence, Rhode Island at the age of 63.

Electoral Record

References

1850 births
1913 deaths
Acadia University alumni
Harvard Law School alumni
Conservative Party of Canada (1867–1942) MPs
Members of the House of Commons of Canada from Nova Scotia
Lawyers in Nova Scotia
Canadian King's Counsel